The 1944–45 Drexel Dragons men's basketball team represented Drexel Institute of Technology during the 1944–45 men's basketball season. The Dragons, led by 1st year head coach Maury McMains, played their home games at Curtis Hall Gym.

Roster

Schedule

|-
!colspan=9 style="background:#F8B800; color:#002663;"| Regular season
|-

References

Drexel Dragons men's basketball seasons
Drexel
1944 in sports in Pennsylvania
1945 in sports in Pennsylvania